People to People is the second extended play by American band DNCE. It was released through Republic Records on June 15, 2018. Production was handled by Robin Hannibal, Stuart Crichton, and Ido Zmishlany. The EP was the last project DNCE released before their hiatus after 2018 ended, due to lead singer Joe Jonas and drummer Jack Lawless resuming work with the Jonas Brothers after they reunited in 2019, and was their last project with bassist and keyboardist Cole Whittle, who did not return after DNCE reunited in early 2022 due to focusing on solo music.

Background
The songs on People to People see DNCE's lead singer, Joe Jonas, "singing sweetly about different aspects of romance, from casual encounters to maintaining the strength of a good and solid relationship". The band announced the EP and its cover art on June 11, 2018, and teased its songs in the next few days leading up to its release. Jonas felt that the EP shows a different and more serious side to the band, in which he commentated: "I feel like musically, the band's come a long way", adding, "We released 'Cake by the Ocean' two years ago. It's fun, it's wacky, we're so proud of it, but there's a serious side to us as well". Jonas also stated in a press release that "these new songs represent the evolution that the band has gone through over the last couple of years. They're a little more chill, sophisticated. We've matured together, and so has the music." The cover art was designed by Carlos Ramirez.

Critical reception
Writing for Medium, Christoph Büscher felt that "'People To People' summarises DNCE's entire discography in just four songs", describing "Lose My Cool" and "Man on Fire" as "two alright but slightly forgettable tracks" that "are outshone by" the "great" track, "Still Good", "and completely eclipsed by an absolute banger", "TV in the Morning". House in the Sand critic Vanessa Jetwash said that "this EP is many things - but mostly it is absolutely smooth and such a feel-good record" and "DNCE have created a sound world of their own and with 'People To People' they let us become a part of it", adding that "it's a cohesive collection of tracks - but boy, it's anything but shallow". Writing for CelebMix, Katrina Rees felt that "whilst the People to People EP still carries elements of DNCE's trademark sound, the four-piece have definitely matured sonically and lyrically", adding that "this EP is their most cohesive body of work to date and showcases a slick, irresistible sound" and praising Jonas' vocals "which are superbly captivating throughout" the project. Thomas Bleach of his magazine of the same name described it as "a more chilled out collection of tracks" that "hears them being a little less chaotic and delivering smoother harmonies and sadly it's a little hit and miss", adding that "Joe Jonas' vocals are great as always and sound even better a little experimental and more croon-worthy but not even that could make me forget how disappointing these songs are". LaurenG of Listen Here Reviews believed that, on the funk EP, "DNCE's constant colorful vibe has remained the same throughout their short career, and nothing bad can be said about People to People" and "hopefully DNCE never lose their inventive streak, as that is what makes them special".

Track listing

Notes
  signifies an additional producer.

Personnel

 DNCE
 Joe Jonas – vocals (all tracks), background vocals (tracks 2–4), songwriting (track 1)
 Jack Lawless – drums (all tracks)
 JinJoo Lee – guitar (all tracks), background vocals (tracks 3–4)
 Cole Whittle – bass (all tracks), background vocals (tracks 3–4)
 Mark "Spike" Stent – mixing 
 Michael Freeman – mixing assistance (all tracks)
 Robert Castillo – recording assistance (tracks 1–2)
 Robin Hannibal – production (tracks 1–2), songwriting (tracks 1–2), engineer (tracks 1–2), programming (tracks 1–2), percussion (tracks 1–2), keyboards (tracks 1–2), guitar (tracks 1–2), bass (track 1), vocal editing (track 1)
 Cass Lowe – songwriting (track 1), background vocals (track 1), keyboards (track 1)
 Teira Lockhart – background vocals (track 1)
 Joel Van Dijk – guitar (tracks 1–2)
 Stuart Crichton – additional production (track 2), songwriting (track 2), keyboards (track 2)
 Wrabel – songwriting (track 2)
 Eric Leva – songwriting (track 2)
 Ido Zmishlany – production (tracks 3–4), background vocals (tracks 3–4), engineering (tracks 3–4), programming (tracks 3–4), keyboards (tracks 3–4), drums (track 4)
 Freddy Wexler – songwriting (tracks 3–4)
 Spencer Lee – songwriting (tracks 3–4)
 Kevin Kesse – songwriting (tracks 3–4)
 Matt Wolach – recording assistance (tracks 3–4)
 Jared Scharff – guitar (track 4)
 Matt Bair – guitar (track 4)
 Andrew Pertes – bass (track 4)
 Noah "Mailbox" Passovoy – engineering (track 4)

References

2018 EPs
DNCE EPs
Albums produced by Stuart Crichton
Albums produced by Ido Zmishlany